Józef Gara (29 January 1929 – 10 July 2013) was a miner who spoke an endangered language of Wilamowice, Wymysorys, which had only 70 native speakers, and created the Wymysorys alphabet. He also wrote poetry in Wymysorys. In 2003 he published Zbiór wierszy oraz słownik języka wilamowskiego (A collection of poems and the dictionary of Wymysorys language). In 2004 he collected old Wymysorys songs, corrected and extended the old ones with a view of releasing them. Between 2004 and 2006 he taught Wymysorys in a primary school in Wilamowice.

Works
"Zbiór wierszy o wilamowskich obrzędach i obyczajach oraz słownik języka wilamowskiego" (A collection of poems and the dictionary of Vilamovian language), TIMEX printing house/Stowarzyszenie Na Rzecz Zachowania Dziedzictwa Kulturowego Miasta Wilamowice "Wilamowiane" (Association for the Conservation of Cultural Heritage of the City of Wilamowice "Wilamowiane"), Bielsko-Biała, 2004, 
Kronika historyczna miasteczka Wilamowice (Historical chronicle of the town of Wilamowice), TIMEX printing house, Wilamowice, 2007
[[wikisource:pl:„Wymysöjer śtytła” – miasteczko Wilamowice oraz jego osobliwości zawarte w zbiorze piosenek wilamowskich Józefa Gary|"Wymysöjer śtytła" : miasteczko Wilamowice oraz jego osobliwości zawarte w zbiorze piosenek wilamowskich Józefa Gary]] ("Wymysöjer śtytła: Wilamowice town and its sights set on a set of Vilamovian songs of Józef Gara''), Wilamowice: Miejsko-Gminny Ośrodek Kultury (Municipal-Gmina Culture Center), 2007.

References
 
Józef Gara's obituary 

1929 births
2013 deaths
Creators of writing systems
Polish miners
20th-century Polish poets
People from Wilamowice